Northern Guangdong, commonly referred to as Yuebei, is a region of northern Guangdong province. It is a region encompassing mountainous and hilly terrain, and includes the region of Guangdong north of the Tropic of Cancer.

Yuebei is a multiethnic region, with a large population speaking Yuebei native languages (／Yuebei Tuhua), Cantonese, Hakka, among others. While it has a history of engaging with variously government-led poverty alleviation projects since the 1980s, the region is increasingly becoming a location for the development of industrial parks, tourism, and organic food production.

See also
Yuebei Tuhua

Other regions of Guangdong
Pearl River Delta
Yuedong, region of eastern Guangdong including Jieyang, Chaozhou, Shanwei and Shantou
Yuexi, region of western Guangdong including Maoming, Zhanjiang and Yangjiang

References

Regions of China
Geography of Guangdong